Meron Teshome Hagos (born 13 July 1992) is an Eritrean cyclist who most recently rode for .

Major results

2013
 African Road Championships
1st  Team time trial (with Natnael Berhane, Meron Russom and Daniel Teklehaimanot)
8th Time trial
 1st  Road race, National Road Championships
 4th Overall Tour of Eritrea
1st Stage 1
 6th Overall Fenkil Northern Red Sea Challenge
 9th Overall La Tropicale Amissa Bongo
2014
 National Road Championships
1st  Under-23 time trial
3rd Time trial
2015
 African Games
1st  Time trial
4th Road race
 1st Stage 5 Tour du Rwanda
 2nd Time trial, National Road Championships
 3rd Hibiscus Cycle Classic, KZN Autumn Series
2016
 1st Stage 2 Tour of Eritrea
 2nd Time trial, National Road Championships
 3rd Massawa Circuit
 5th Asmara Circuit
2017
 African Road Championships
1st  Time trial
1st  Team time trial
 2nd Massawa Circuit
 4th Asmara Circuit
 6th Overall Tour du Cameroun
1st Stages 3 & 5
 7th Overall La Tropicale Amissa Bongo
 9th Overall Tour of Eritrea
1st Points classification
1st Stages 1 & 3
2019
 1st  Team time trial, African Road Championships

References

External links

1992 births
Living people
Eritrean male cyclists
African Games gold medalists for Eritrea
African Games medalists in cycling
Competitors at the 2015 African Games